The San Sebastian Parish Church, informally known as Lumban Church, is the only Roman Catholic Church in Lumban, Laguna, Philippines. Its titular is St. Sebastian and its feast is celebrated every January 20. The first tabernacle outside Manila was inaugurated in Lumban including the first Eucharistic Procession outside of Manila. The Franciscans established the first School for Church Music in the country in this town under Father Juan de Santa Maria, OFM. Today, the church is under the pastoral care of the Clerical Congregation of the Missionaries of Faith.

History 
When the Franciscans first arrived in the Philippines in 1578, Father Juán Portocarrero de Plasencia and Father Diego de Oropesa de San José started the evangelization of the province of Laguna. Lumban, together with Pila became the first Spanish town of the province and heart of the Franciscan missionary activities in Laguna. Father Juán de Plasencia served as parish priest of Lumban in 1578 with St. Francis of Assisi as its original patron. A church made of nipa and bamboo was first built in a site called Entablado, in the northern portion of the town. The first church was destroyed by flood and later rebuilt in wood.  However, the wooden church was burned in 1586. Lumban became the first Franciscan mission settlement in the country. The government allowed San Pedro Bautista to build the church and convent in stone on that same year.

The church of Lumban was finished in 1600. It became the first stone church in Laguna and the first Franciscan building outside Manila made out of stone.

In this church, the first tabernacle outside Manila was built including the first Eucharistic Procession outside of Manila on October 9, 1600. On October 8, prior to the eucharistic procession, choirs from Santa Ana de Sapa, Pangil, Nagcarlan, Pila and Lumban sang in a mass officiated by Father Juan Montes de Oca, provincial of the Augustinians. Based on the records of Felix Huerta, the parish has two chapels dedicated to Saint Sebastian and the Holy Cross. Adjacent to the church is the church convent (convento) built under the term of Father Francisco de Cañaveras.

The first School for Church Music in the country was established by the Franciscans in Lumban under Father Juan de Santa Maria, OFM on 1606. Around 400 boys were taught liturgical hymns and use of musical instruments. The church also served as infirmary or hospital of the male Franciscan religious from 1606 to 1618 before it was transferred to Pila.

In the 18th century, the town adopted Saint Sebastian Martyr as its patron saint. It was seriously damaged during the 1880 Luzon earthquakes. and was restored by Father Manuel Rodriguez in 1889. The massive church of Lumban was completed in its original form during the American occupation and was dubbed as the biggest stone church in Laguna. It was again heavily damaged during the Japanese occupation in 1941 and a storm in 1947.

Architecture
The church has a three-story facade. To its right is a square based three level octagonal bell tower with the statue of San Sebastian, its patron saint on top.

Media
The church appears in the ABS-CBN television series Huwag Kang Mangamba, depicted as Hermoso church that was later burned down.

Notes

Bibliography

External links 

San Sebastian Parish-Lumban
San Sebastian Parish - Lumban, Laguna Official Facebook page

1600 establishments in the Philippines
Roman Catholic churches completed in 1600
Roman Catholic churches in Laguna (province)
Marked Historical Structures of the Philippines
16th-century Roman Catholic church buildings in the Philippines
Churches in the Roman Catholic Diocese of San Pablo